James Scott (1810 – 15 October 1884) was an Australian politician.

Scott was born in Earlston, Berwickshire, in Scotland in 1810. In 1869 he was elected to the Tasmanian House of Assembly, representing the seat of George Town. He served until 1877, and was then elected for South Launceston in 1878, serving until his death in Launceston in 1884.

References

1810 births
1884 deaths
Members of the Tasmanian House of Assembly